There are currently seven United States congressional districts in South Carolina. There have been as few as four and as many as nine congressional districts in South Carolina. Because of the state population growth in the 2010 census, South Carolina regained its 7th district, which had remained unused since the Civil War.

On January 6, 2023, a federal panel of judges ruled that the current 1st district lines were unconstitutional due to racial gerrymandering and would have to be redrawn April of that year.

Current districts and representatives
List of members of the United States House delegation from South Carolina, their terms, their district boundaries, and the district political ratings according to the CPVI. The House delegation has 7 members, including 6 Republicans and 1 Democrat as of 2023.

District cities and counties

First congressional district

Counties
 Beaufort County
 Berkeley County
 Charleston County (part)
 Colleton County (part)
 Dorchester County (part)
 Jasper County (part)

Second congressional district

Counties
 Aiken County
 Barnwell County
 Lexington County
 Orangeburg County (part)
 Richland County (part)

Third congressional district

Counties
 Abbeville County
 Anderson County
 Edgefield County
 Greenville County (part)
 Greenwood County
 Laurens County
 McCormick County
 Newberry County
 Oconee County
 Pickens County
 Saluda County

Fourth congressional district

Counties
Greenville County (part)
Spartanburg County (part)

District contains the two major cities of Greenville and Spartanburg.

Fifth congressional district

Counties
 Cherokee County
 Chester County
 Fairfield County
 Kershaw County
 Lancaster County
 Lee County
 Spartanburg County (part)
 Sumter County (part)
 Union County
 York County

Sixth congressional district

Counties
 Allendale County
 Bamberg County
 Calhoun County 
 Charleston County (part)
 Clarendon County
 Colleton County (part)
 Dorchester County (part)
 Florence County (part)
 Hampton County
 Jasper County (part)
 Orangeburg County (part)
 Richland County (part)
 Sumter County (part)
 Williamsburg County

Seventh congressional district

Counties
 Chesterfield County
 Darlington County
 Dillon County
 Florence County (part)
 Georgetown County
 Horry County
 Marion County
 Marlboro County

Historical and present district boundaries
Table of United States congressional district boundary maps in the State of South Carolina, presented chronologically. All redistricting events that took place in South Carolina between 1973 and 2013 are shown.

Obsolete districts

Eighth congressional district

The eighth congressional district seat was eliminated after the 1840 census.

Ninth congressional district

The ninth congressional district seat was eliminated after the 1840 census.

See also

List of United States congressional districts
South Carolina Democratic Party
South Carolina Libertarian Party
South Carolina Republican Party

References